Semble is a legal term used when discussing published opinions. The word is the Norman (and Modern) French verbal form for  meaning "it seems or appears to be"  or, more simply, "it seems".

Law
The legal expression "semble" indicates that the point to which it refers is uncertain or represents only the judge's opinion. In a law report, the expression precedes a proposition of law which is an obiter dictum by the judge, or a suggestion by the reporter.

For example, in the headnote for House of Lords' decision in Hedley Byrne v Heller, the reporter uses the term semble when summarising certain remarks of Lords Reid, Morris, and Hodson on a point which did not arise for decision in the case; semble indicates that this may be the law, but it falls to a future case to decide authoritatively.

In Simpkins v Pays [1955], Sellers J, having made an award to the plaintiff, suggested "semble" that an equal award was due to the defendant's granddaughter, even though she was not party to the action.

References 

Old French
English legal terminology